was a Japanese businessman and politician. He was a veteran of the Boshin War. He was the fourth Governor of Okinawa Prefecture (1883–1886) and the sixth Governor of Osaka (1889–1891).

References 

1843 births
1908 deaths
Japanese businesspeople
Governors of Okinawa Prefecture
Governors of Osaka
People of the Boshin War
Recipients of the Order of the Sacred Treasure, 2nd class